Thomas Davis (Irish: CLG Tomás Dáibhís) is a Gaelic Athletic Association club with extensive grounds and a clubhouse located on the Kiltipper Road in Tallaght, County Dublin, Ireland. Founded in 1888, Thomas Davis has a long association with Tallaght from the time when it was a small rural village in the countryside. The club motto is Nascann Dúshlán Daoine (A Challenge Unites People).

Club facilities
For many years Thomas Davis played on a field adjacent to the Church of Ireland chapel, known as 'The Graveyard' in Old Tallaght Village (beside the Belgard Road where Smyths Toys is currently located) before relocating in the early 1980s to a green field site on the Kiltipper Road. The club continued to use the Graveyard, together with public pitches in Seán Walsh Park, Dodder Park and Aylesbury throughout the 1990s. The Seán Walsh Park fields were subsequently redeveloped into a man-made lake and landscaped areas, with plans for a stadium to be there also (see below). Early development of club facilities were primarily financed through private sources, including the sale of life memberships, a series of large-scale private members draws and general club fund raising activities. In more recent years, the club has also benefited from grants from the Department of Arts, Sport and Tourism. Government grants totalled in excess of €500,000 from 2001 to 2003.
A further grant of €200,000 was announced in April 2007.

History
The club was formed in 1888 and for many years played their football in the Old Bawn area of Tallaght. In the early 1960s they moved their playing pitch to the Belgard Road and then on to what was known as the Grave Yard pitch behind the Grave Yard in Tallaght Village.
Hugh Kelly played for Dublin in 1930. Other famous Davis players to wear the county jerseys were Paul Curran, Dave Foran and Martin Noctor who won an all Ireland and Leinster medal. In ladies football Siobhán McGrath has won 2 All Star Awards and an All-Ireland medal.
Thomas Davis have won the Dublin Senior Football Championship on three occasions in 1989, 1990, 1991, going on to win the Leinster Senior Club Football Championship twice, on both occasions after epic matches against Wicklow champions, Baltinglass. The club also won the Dublin Under 21 Football Championship in 1992, beating Fingallians, 1–7 to 0–8.

Thomas Davis won the Dublin Senior Hurling Championship once, in 1913.

More recently, Thomas Davis faced Round Towers in the 2006 final of the Dublin AFL Division 1 and won by a scoreline of 0–10 to 0-07. Shane Smith played a prominent role, scoring a prolific 0-08 points in the game which denied Round Towers their first ever league title.

In 2007, Davis won the John Humphrey Memorial Cup by beating Lucan Sarsfields in the final.

Achievements
 Leinster Senior Club Football Championship: Winners (2) 1990, 1991
 Dublin Senior Football Championship: Winners (3) 1989, 1990, 1991
 Dublin Senior 2 Football Championship: Winners 2018
 Dublin Junior Football Championship: Winners (2) 1957, 1982
 Dublin Junior C Football Championship Winner 2013
 Dublin Under 21 Football Championship: Winner 1992
 Dublin Under 21 B Football Championship: Winner 2011
 Dublin Minor Football Championship Winners (1) 1991
 Dublin Minor D Football Championship Winners 2017
 Dublin Senior Football League Winners 2001, 2006
 Dublin Senior Hurling Championship: Winners (1) 1913
 Dublin Intermediate Hurling Championship: Winner 2017
 Dublin Junior E Hurling Championship Winners 2013
 Dublin Under 21 B Hurling Championship Winner 2016
 Dublin Minor C Hurling Championship Winners 2012
 Dublin Minor D Hurling Championship Winners 2010

Dispute over Tallaght Stadium
Thomas Davis were involved in a long running series of objections relating to the Tallaght Stadium. Thomas Davis initially objected to the original planning permission almost ten years ago. More recently, they sought to overturn a council decision that assigns a sports stadium under development in Tallaght with a playing surface unsuitable to the dimension of a senior GAA pitch. The minister for sport and SDCC have indicated that Junior GAA games will be accommodated in the current design as junior GAA games would not require an increased pitch size. South Dublin County Council initially decided that the stadium would be multi-use containing an association football sized pitch. This was reversed in January 2006 when SDCC sought to include a Senior GAA pitch also. The council reverted to the original plans after they were informed by the Minister for Sport that he would not fund the stadium unless it was designated as association football only (RTÉ, 2007). The intention of the council is that the League of Ireland football club, Shamrock Rovers would play in the new facility. The Rovers chairman stated on 13 March 2007, "But we're also amazed that a local GAA club - that already has superb, funded facilities in place - can begrudge us the opportunity to complete the club's move to the new stadium.".

In a High Court application to have the design of the Tallaght Stadium changed Thomas Davis argued that they would be placed "at a severe disadvantage in attracting the youth of Tallaght to our club, our sport and the GAA culture". In a reserved judgment, made on 30 March 2007, Justice Iarflaidh O'Neill found in favour of Thomas Davis in seeking leave for a judicial review of the decision-making process that led to the decision to designate the facility as single rather than multi-use, stating that Thomas Davis had established that it did indeed have a 'substantial interest' in the case and had raised the necessary 'substantial' grounds required for leave to be given for a judicial review of planning decisions.

However, in a subsequent ruling on the 14 December 2007, Mr Justice Roderick Murphy ruled against Thomas Davis in the Judicial Review. After a delay of over 2 years building work at the stadium resumed in 2008. An application by Thomas Davis for leave to appeal this decision to the Supreme Court was refused at a hearing on 25 January 2008. At this hearing Thomas Davis were also instructed to pay the full costs of South Dublin County Council and Shamrock Rovers F.C.

Notable players

Paul Curran, former all-Ireland winning player with Dublin
Paul Nugent, former Dublin senior football selector
Paul Hudson
Zak Moradi
Cian “Cheese” Murphy
Davy “Daddy Cool” Keogh

External links
Thomas Davis CLG website
Dublin Club GAA
Dublin GAA

References

Gaelic games clubs in South Dublin (county)
Gaelic football clubs in South Dublin (county)
Tallaght